Down South is the title of a recording by American folk music artists Doc Watson and Merle Watson, released in 1984.

It has been reissued on CD by Rykodisc and Sugar Hill.

Track listing
All songs Traditional unless otherwise noted.
 "Solid Gone" – 3:02 
 "Bright Sunny South" – 2:36 
 "Slidin' Delta" (Mississippi John Hurt) – 2:03 
 "Coal Miner's Blues" (Carter) – 2:30 
 "Hesitation Blues" – 2:46 
 "What a Friend We Have in Jesus" (Charles C. Converse, Joseph M. Scriven) – 3:35 
 "Fifteen Cents" – 2:28 
 "Twin Sisters" – 1:39 
 "The Hobo" – 4:18 
 "Cotton-Eyed Joe" – 1:48 
 "Hello Stranger" (Carter) – 2:17 
 "Down South" – 2:35

Personnel
Doc Watson – guitar, harmonica, vocals
Merle Watson – guitar, banjo, slide guitar
T. Michael Coleman – bass, harmony vocals
Buddy Davis – bass
Sam Bush – fiddle
Production notes
Produced by Merle Watson
Engineered and mixed by Carl Rudisill

References

External links
 Doc Watson discography

1984 albums
Doc Watson albums
Flying Fish Records albums